Ciboulette  is a 1933 French musical film directed by Claude Autant-Lara and starring Simone Berriau, Robert Burnier and Armand Dranem. It is an adaptation of the 1923 operetta of the same name. The film's art direction was by Lazare Meerson and Alexandre Trauner. It was part of a popular cycle of operetta films during the decade.

Cast
 Simone Berriau as Ciboulette 
 Robert Burnier as Antonin 
 Armand Dranem as Le père Grenu  
 André Urban as Monsieur Duparquet 
 Madeleine Guitty as La mère Pingret  
 Pomiès as Olivier Métra  
 Thérèse Dorny as Zénobie  
 Guy Ferrant as Roger de Lansquenet  
 Marcel Duhamel as Le voleur  
 Jacques Prévert as L'Âne  
 Ginette Leclerc as Une cocotte  
 Viviane Romance as Une cocotte  
 Monique Joyce as Une cocotte  
 Christiane Dor as La servante  
 Marie-Jacqueline Chantal as Une invitée chez Métra  
 Charles Camus as Grisart  
 Louis Florencie as Trancher  
 Pedro Elviro as Arthur et Meyer
 Lucien Raimbourg as Victor  
 Raymond Bussières as Un clochard 
 Eugène Stuber as Un fort des halles et un faune 
 Pépa Cara
 Robert Casa
 Andrée Doria 
 Gazelle
 Jean Lods
 Max Morise  
 Léon Moussinac
 Pierre Sabas

References

Bibliography 
 Goble, Alan. The Complete Index to Literary Sources in Film. Walter de Gruyter, 1999.

External links 
 

1933 films
French musical films
1933 musical films
1930s French-language films
Films directed by Claude Autant-Lara
Operetta films
Films based on operettas
Films based on works by Francis de Croisset
Pathé films
French black-and-white films
1930s French films